OTO Melara was a subsidiary of the Italian company Finmeccanica, today Leonardo, active in the defence sector, with factories in Brescia and La Spezia. The Mod 56 pack howitzer, in service throughout the world, and the 76mm naval gun, adopted by 53 navies and installed on over 1,000 naval vessels, are among OTO Melara's best known weapons since World War II.

From 1 January 2016, the activities of OTO Melara merged into Leonardo's Defence Systems Division, within the Electronics, Defence and Security Systems Sector.

History

Pre–World War I
It was founded in 1905 as a joint venture of Vickers and Terni Steelworks, Cantiere navale fratelli Orlando and Cantieri navali Odero. Investment was also provided by Giuseppe Orlando and Attilio Odero. During World War I, Vickers Terni produced many weapons with calibre 40 mm and upwards. In 1929 the company was renamed Odero Terni Orlando with the abbreviation OTO. During World War II, mostly heavy guns for battleships were produced.

Post–World War II
In 1953 the company took the name OTO Melara.

Before Italy joined NATO, OTO Melara produced civil products, like tractors and looms, but quickly returned to the production of weapons. On 1 December 2001, the naval artillery division of OTO Melara merged with that of Breda Meccanica Bresciana to form Otobreda. The combined entity produces the DARDO CIWS, Otobreda 76 mm and Otobreda 127/54 Compact naval guns. OTO Melara's land defence operations are part of the Leonardo conglomerate.

Main products
Vehicles manufactured include:
Ariete Main Battle Tank
OF-40 Main Battle Tank
Centauro Wheeled Tank Destroyer
Dardo Infantry Fighting Vehicle
VBM Freccia 8×8 Wheeled Infantry Fighting Vehicle
Puma 6×6 and Puma 4×4 Wheeled Armoured Personnel Carrier
Palmaria self-propelled artillery
Otomatic anti-aircraft tank (SPAAG)

Weapons manufactured includes:
OTO Melara Mod 56 105/L14 Pack Howitzer
OTO Marlin 40 
HITFACT three-man turret armed with a 120mm/45 calibre or 105mm/52 calibre gun
Hitfist two-man turret armed with a 25 or 30mm automatic cannon and 7.62mm coaxial machine gun (plus two TOW launchers as option)
Hitfist OWS Remotely operated turret armed with a 25 or 30mm automatic cannon and 7.62mm coaxial machine gun (plus two TOW launchers as option)
Hitrole Remote Weapon Station for 7.62mm or 12.7mm machine gun or 40 automatic grenade launcher
Small calibre naval turrets 12,7 LIONFISH
Otobreda 127/54 Compact naval gun
Otobreda 127/64 Lightweight naval gun
76/62mm Allargato
Otobreda 76 mm naval gun
Otomat Anti-ship missile
Skyguard "Aspide" Anti-Air missile system
SIDAM 25 anti-aircraft gun
DARDO CIWS a twin 40mm naval gun mounting
MSS 1.2 Anti tank guided missile

Ammunition manufactured include:
Vulcano 76/127/155mm

In the last decade the company has produced between 900 and 1000 GBU-31 and GBU-32 JDAMs on license. At the moment it is working on the production of 500 GBU-39s for the Aeronautica Militare.

The naval defence operations produce a wide range of automatic naval artillery, rocket and missile launchers and remote controlled small calibre defence cannons.

See also
List of Italian companies

References

External links
Leonardo official website

 http://bp1.blogger.com/_Ov8q5T5kYx8/RzS3XXESUiI/AAAAAAAAABA/CcB0TEuLu7Y/s1600-h/otomelara12.7mm.jpg

 
Defence companies of Italy
Firearm manufacturers of Italy
Brescia
La Spezia
Manufacturing companies established in 1905
Italian companies established in 1905
Italian brands
Leonardo S.p.A.